Sachin Tanwar (born 19 July 1999) is an Indian kabaddi player who currently plays for the Patna Pirates in the VIVO Pro Kabaddi league and the Indian national team. The raider was among the top 10 raid point scorers in the league in his debut campaign and repeated that feat in the subsequent season as well. He made his debut in the Indian kabaddi team in 2017.

Kabaddi career

Season 5 

Sachin was Gujarat Fortunegiants’ highest raid point scorer in his debut campaign, finishing with 159. He made his debut in his team’s 26-20 victory over Dabang Delhi K.C. in Hyderabad and scored three raid points. His first notable individual performance came in his team’s 32-20 loss against Haryana Steelers in Nagpur, where he led his team in scoring with eight. He scored his first career Super 10 in the Fortunegiants’ 29-19 victory over the Telugu Titans in Ahmedabad. He finished the campaign with seven Super 10s and two Super Raids at a strike rate of 53.89.

Season 6 

Sachin needed four games to register his first Super 10 of the campaign, doing so against the Haryana Steelers in the Fortunegiants’ 36-25 victory in Patna. He scored his second in the subsequent game against Puneri Paltan in a 37-27 win for the Fortunegiants. Sachin bettered his raid point tally from the previous campaign and finished with 190 in 23 matches. He scored seven Super 10s and finished among the top 10 raid point scorer for the second season running.

International

He was part of the Indian team that won gold in the Asian Kabaddi Championship 2017.

Records and achievements
 VIVO Pro Kabaddi runner up (2016)
 
 Gold at 2017 Southeast Asian Games
 Gold at 2017 Asian Beach Games

Records and achievements
 Best Debutant (2017)

References

1999 births
Indian kabaddi players
Living people
Pro Kabaddi League players